Dicronorhina is a small genus of fairly large sub-Saharan flower chafers; the name has frequently been misspelled (as Dicronorrhina and Dicranorrhina) following misspellings and unjustified replacement naming in 1841 and 1842.

Description
Their basic body colour is metallic green, with white stripes in some species. The male has a "T"-shaped, flat horn in the forehead. The larvae live in the soil on decaying vegetable material. The development will take 8–9 months, and the adult beetles can live 3–4 months, so that there is one generation per year.

Distribution
This genus is widespread in Africa south of the Sahara.

List of species
There are four species in this genus:

 Dicronorhina cavifrons Westwood, 1843
 Dicronorhina derbyana Westwood, 1843
 Dicronorhina kouensis Legrand, Bouyer, Juhel & Camiade, 2006
 Dicronorhina micans (Drury, 1773)

Gallery

References

External links
 
 
 Flower Beetles
  Encyclopedia of Life

Cetoniinae
Scarabaeidae genera